Sinead Louise Farrelly (born November 16, 1989) is an American former soccer player who played as a midfielder. She previously played for Boston Breakers of the National Women's Soccer League. In 2011, she played for the Philadelphia Independence of the WPS and was a member of the United States U-23 women's national soccer team. She was selected by the Philadelphia Independence as the No. 2 overall pick in the 2011 WPS Draft from University of Virginia. She was a Hermann Trophy semifinalist in 2009 And 2010.

Early life

Born and raised in Havertown, Pennsylvania, Farrelly began playing soccer at the age of five. She attended Haverford High School where she was a four-time team MVP and earned First Team All All-Southeastern PA honors. She was named a 2006 NSCAA Youth All-American and ranked seventh as the nation's top recruit by SoccerBuzz.

Farrelly was a member of the Spirit United Gaels club that was the 2006 National Runner-Up and was played for the Region I Olympic Development Program (ODP) team. During her time with the Spirit United Gaels, the team was a US Youth Soccer National Finalist (2006), a USYS Regional Champions (2006), and a Two-Time State Champions (2005 & 2006. Her team's incredible run in 2006, although cut short by a loss to FC Wisconsin Eclipse in the National Championship in Des Moines, Iowa, won their head coach, Sean McCafferty, the 2006 EPYSA Girls' Coach of the Year Award and 2006 NSCAA Regional Youth Girls' Coach of the Year Award. The Gaels made it through to Regionals the next year on a wildcard after a tough loss to the FC Pennsylvania Strikers in the State Cup Final. Their Regionals drive did not finish as they would have aspired to, as they did not even make the final this year.

University of Virginia
Farrelly attended the University of Virginia and played for the Cavaliers in the Atlantic Coast Conference (ACC). As a freshman in 2007, she started all 23 games and ranked third on the team with five goals (including three game-winners) and four assists. She was named First Team All-ACC, Second Team NSCAA All-Mid-Atlantic, and Top Drawer Soccer Co-National Rookie of the Year. During her sophomore season, she started all 23 games and ranked third on the team in scoring with five goals and three assists. She was named to the ACC All-Tournament Team, First Team All-ACC, and NSCAA and Soccer Buzz All Mid-Atlantic Region. As a junior, she started all 22 games and led the Cavaliers in scoring with eight goals and eight assists for a total of 24 points. She was named Second Team NSCAA All-America selection and was a MAC Hermann Trophy semifinalist. During her senior year, Farrelly was honored as the University of Virginia's top female athlete of 2010–11 after starting all 22 games and leading the Cavaliers with 12 goals and seven assists (for a total of 31 points). She was named ACC Offensive Player of the Year and was a NSCAA First Team All-American. She earned her fourth straight All-ACC selection and was a MAC Hermann Trophy semifinalist for the second time.

Farrelly's 90 games started ranks her second to future FC Kansas City teammate, Becky Sauerbrunn in the school's history. She ranked eighth in school history with 84 points scored in her career and eighth for most in a season with 31.

Playing career

Club

Philadelphia Independence, 2011
Farrelly was the number two pick in the 2011 WPS Draft by the Philadelphia Independence. She tallied one goal and two assists for the Independence while starting in 13 of 14 games played (1101 minutes). Her first WPS career goal occurred during a match against Western New York, which ended up being the game-winning goal and solidified a first place standing for the Independence in mid-July. The Independence would later come in second at the WPS Championship.

New York Fury, 2012
After the WPS suspended operations in early 2012, Farrelly signed with the New York Fury in the WPSL Elite.

Apollon Limassol, 2012–2013
Farrelly played for Apollon Limassol from 2012 to 2013 in the UEFA Women's Champions League. She made five starts in five games for the club and scored six goals. During this time. Farrelly broke her arm in their first leg of their first game of the Knockout Stage against ASD Torres CF.

FC Kansas City, 2013
In 2013, Farrelly signed with FC Kansas City for the inaugural season of the National Women's Soccer League. She scored her first goal for the club in a home match against Seattle Reign FC, helping the Blues notch their first win for the season.

Apollon Limassol, 2013–2014
At the end of the 2013 NWSL season, Farrelly joined Cypriot team Apollon Limassol for a second time, this time on loan from FC Kansas City. The loan spell will end on January 31, 2014.

Portland Thorns FC 2014–2015 
On January 13, 2014, Portland Thorns FC announced that they had obtained Farrelly from FC Kansas City in exchange for a second-round draft pick (16th pick overall) in the 2014 NWSL College Draft.

Boston Breakers 2016
On October 26, 2015, Boston Breakers announced that they had obtained Farrelly from Portland Thorns FC in a package deal along with McCall Zerboni for first-round (No. 2 overall) and second-round (No. 20 overall) picks in the 2016 National Women's Soccer League College Draft. Farrelly sat the season out due to neck and back injuries sustained from a car crash.

Seattle Reign 2016
In October 2016, Seattle Reign FC selected Farrelly off the NWSL Re-Entry Wire. She announced her retirement on Facebook on December 2, 2016.

International
Farrelly has represented the United States at the U-15, U-16, U-17, U-20, and U-23 levels.

Personal life

During her career, Farrelly was closely connected to former women's soccer coach Paul Riley, playing for three of his teams in three different leagues. She publicly revealed accusations of sexual coercion against Riley for a 2021 story in The Athletic. Riley was fired from his position and both the NWSL and FIFA commenced investigations in the coming days.

References

External links 
 Philadelphia Independence player profile
 UEFA Champions League player profile
 FC Kansas City player profile

1989 births
Living people
Philadelphia Independence players
American women's soccer players
National Women's Soccer League players
FC Kansas City players
New York Fury players
Virginia Cavaliers women's soccer players
Soccer players from Pennsylvania
People from Delaware County, Pennsylvania
Apollon Ladies F.C. players
Expatriate women's footballers in Cyprus
American expatriates in Cyprus
Women's association football midfielders
Portland Thorns FC players
Women's Professional Soccer players
LGBT association football players